LaPlante is a settlement in New Brunswick.

History

Notable people

See also
List of communities in New Brunswick

References
 

Communities in Gloucester County, New Brunswick
Designated places in New Brunswick
Settlements in New Brunswick